Diplocalyptis tennuicula is a species of moth of the family Tortricidae. It is found in Zhejiang, China.

References

Archipini
Moths of Asia
Insects of China
Endemic fauna of Zhejiang
Moths described in 1984
Taxa named by Józef Razowski